Goran Dević (born 1971) is a Croatian film director and screenwriter.

Born in Sisak Dević was formally educated at the University of Zagreb's Faculty of Law, the Faculty of Humanities and Social Sciences (archeology department) and the  Academy of Dramatic Art (film directing department).

Since the early 2000s Dević directed a number of short subjects and short documentaries. His feature film directorial debut (which he co-directed and co-written with Zvonimir Jurić) was a critically acclaimed 2009 psychological war drama titled The Blacks. The film deals with a fictional Croatian Army unit who refuse to lay down their arms following the end of the Croatian War of Independence.

The film won Jurić and Dević the Golden Arena for Best Director at the 2009 Pula Film Festival, the Croatian national film awards. It went on to be selected as Croatia's submission to the 83rd Academy Awards for the Academy Award for Best Foreign Language Film, but it failed to make the final shortlist.

In 2017, Dević has signed the Declaration on the Common Language of the Croats, Serbs, Bosniaks and Montenegrins.

Filmography
The Blacks (Crnci, 2009; co-director)

References

External links
Goran Dević at Film.hr 

1971 births
Croatian film directors
Croatian screenwriters
People from Sisak
Golden Arena for Best Director winners
Living people
Signatories of the Declaration on the Common Language